The Crawling Distance is 11th studio album released by singer-songwriter Robert Pollard on January 20, 2009. Similar to many of Pollard's releases since Fiction Man in 2004, all instrumentation on the album was performed by producer Todd Tobias.

Track listing
 "Faking My Harlequin" - 3:46
 "Cave Zone" - 2:55
 "Red Cross Vegas Night" - 3:41
 "The Butler Stands for All of Us" - 3:45
 "It's Easy" - 4:09
 "No Island" - 4:49
 "Silence Be Destroyed" - 2:49
 "Imaginary Queen Ann" - 2:20
 "On Short Wave" - 3:21
 "Too Much Fun" - 4:09

References

2009 albums
Robert Pollard albums